The Crow River is a tributary of the Mississippi River in south-central Minnesota in the United States.

Name
The earliest record of the name for Crow River is "Karishon River", reflecting the Dakota language Khaŋǧí Šúŋ Watpá (now Wakpá), meaning "The Large Wing-feather of the Crow River". In other documents, this was translated as "Crow Wing River", or by its Ojibwe language name "Undeg-sipi" (from Aandego-ziibi), meaning "Crow River".  Early explorers recorded the name of this river in various ways: "Goose River" by Jonathan Carver, "Rook's River" by Giacomo Beltrami, and as "Karishon or Crow River" by Joseph Nicollet.
The North Fork of the Crow River was named by the Ojibwe Indians for the bird they called the "marauder of newly planted corn."

Hydrography
The Crow River flows for most of its length as three streams:

A minor headwaters tributary of the North Fork is named the Skunk River. The average discharge of the North Fork Crow River, based on data gathered at the USGS station at Paynesville, and data gathered at the USGS station on the Middle Fork Crow River at Spicer (the North Fork is measured above where the Middle Fork flows in), is 173 cubic feet per second. See below for the link to the Spicer station.
At Spicer, the river measures approximately 67 cubic feet per second.
Portions of the South Fork's upper course have been heavily straightened and channelized. At Mayer, the river has a mean annual discharge of 259 cubic feet per second.

The north and south forks converge at Rockford to form the Crow River, which flows for  northeastward to the Mississippi River. The river's course is used to define the boundary between Wright and Hennepin counties.

The Crow flows through Greenfield, Hanover, St. Michael, Otsego and Dayton; it enters the Mississippi River from the south at the common boundary between Otsego and Dayton.

Landscape
The Crow River, North Fork flows southeast from Lake Koronis for about 125 miles until it joins the Mississippi River at Dayton. The roughly 40 mile stretch from upstream of Rockford to the Mississippi is considered to be the best for canoeing. Upstream from Buffalo, you will encounter more challenging paddling due to sandy, erodible banks and fast-growing silver maples that frequently fall and block the river. In this stretch, you may see more wildlife, but you have to work harder to get around numerous obstacles.

See also
List of rivers of Minnesota

References

Columbia Gazetteer of North America entry
Waters, Thomas F. (1977).  The Streams and Rivers of Minnesota.  Minneapolis: University of Minnesota Press.  .

External links
Minnesota DNR - Crow River, North Fork
Minnesota DNR - Crow River, South Fork

Rivers of Minnesota
Tributaries of the Mississippi River
Rivers of Hennepin County, Minnesota
Rivers of Pope County, Minnesota
Rivers of Stearns County, Minnesota
Rivers of Kandiyohi County, Minnesota
Rivers of Meeker County, Minnesota
Rivers of Wright County, Minnesota
Rivers of McLeod County, Minnesota
Rivers of Carver County, Minnesota